Sid Meier's Civilization: A New Dawn is a 2017 strategy board game created by James Kniffen based on the Civilization series of video games.  It is primarily inspired by the series' 2016 iteration, Civilization VI. Each player takes the role of a historical civilization, competing with other players with the goal of fulfilling various historically-inspired victory conditions in order to win the game.

Gameplay

Reception
Some reviews praised A New Dawns features, many of which simplified the game compared to its 2010 predecessor, Civilization: The Board Game.  Deseret News praised the addition of "focus cards" particularly and called the game "engrossing", stating that it "doesn't have all the bells and whistles of its older brother, but it has its own secret sauce, an original new mechanism that streamlines play while keeping things detailed and interesting."  Some reviews stated that the game might be "too streamlined".  Luke Plunkett of Kotaku.com compared it unfavorably with the computer-game version, writing, "It reaches too far, and by cutting straight to the heart of Civilizations video game design, forgets everything else that makes Civ so much fun on a computer." The game has an overall rating of 7.3 on the website BoardGameGeek.com.

References

External links
Civilization: A New Dawn Official Website.  FantasyFlightGames.com.

Board game
Board games introduced in 2017
Board games about history
Fantasy Flight Games games
Licensed board games